Auguste Vincent (27 June 1915 – 22 October 1998) was a Canadian lawyer and politician. Vincent served as a Liberal party member of the House of Commons of Canada. Born in Lorrainville, Quebec.

He was first elected at the Longueuil riding in the 1953 general election and re-elected for a second term in 1957. In the 1958 election he was defeated by Pierre Sévigny of the Progressive Conservative party. Vincent also made an unsuccessful bid to return to Parliament at Longueuil in the 1962 election.

References

External links
 
 Profile of Auguste Vincent 

1915 births
1998 deaths
Members of the House of Commons of Canada from Quebec
Liberal Party of Canada MPs
Lawyers in Quebec
20th-century Canadian lawyers